The Church Street Historic District  is a national historic district located in the village of Saranac Lake (Harrietstown) in Franklin County, New York.  The district extends roughly along Church Street from Main Street to St. Bernard Street.  It comprises twenty-seven buildings, including three churches, a medical laboratory, ten homes, two libraries, and six cure cottages, most built between the late 1870s and 1900.

Church Street is one of the five original streets of the village, connecting River Street to Main Street.  Most of the buildings have features reflecting their use as cure cottages by residents suffering from tuberculosis. Patients sat out on the "cure porches" in order to be exposed daily, year round, to as much fresh air as possible.

It was listed on the National Register of Historic Places in 1992.

Gallery

References

External links
 Church Street Historic District, at Saranac Lake

Historic districts on the National Register of Historic Places in New York (state)
Gothic Revival architecture in New York (state)
Historic districts in Franklin County, New York
National Register of Historic Places in Franklin County, New York
Saranac Lake, New York